The 2010–11 season was the 114th season of competitive football in Scotland.

Overview
 Rangers won the SPL title, pipping rivals Celtic on the final day of the season, their third title in a row and their 54th Scottish league championship. It was Walter Smith's final season as manager of Rangers.
 Inverness Caledonian Thistle are competing in the Scottish Premier League for the sixth time, their last season in the top-flight since the 2008–09 season, after being promoted as First Division champions last season.
 Stirling Albion are competing in the First Division after being promoted as Second Division champions.
 Arbroath won the Third Division, the first title in the club's 133-year history.

Referee strike

Transfer deals

League Competitions

Scottish Premier League

Scottish First Division

Scottish Second Division

Scottish Third Division

Scottish Premier Under-19 League

Honours

Cup honours

Non-league honours

Senior

Junior
West Region

East Region

North Region

Individual honours

PFA Scotland awards

SFWA awards

Scottish clubs in Europe

Summary

 All teams had been eliminated.
 Current UEFA coefficients: Ranking

Rangers
2010–11 UEFA Champions League

2010–11 UEFA Europa League

Celtic
2010–11 UEFA Champions League

2010–11 UEFA Europa League

Dundee United
2010–11 UEFA Europa League

Hibernian
2010–11 UEFA Europa League

Motherwell
2010–11 UEFA Europa League

National teams

Scotland national team

Scotland Under-21 team

Deaths
 29 July – Alex Wilson, 76, Portsmouth and Scotland defender.
 2 September – Jackie Sinclair, 67, Dunfermline and Scotland winger.
 30 October – John Benson, 67, Manchester City, Torquay United, Bournemouth, Exeter City and Norwich City defender; Bournemouth, Manchester City, Burnley and Wigan Athletic manager.
 10 November – Jim Farry, 56, Scottish Football League secretary (1979–1990) and Scottish Football Association chief executive (1990–1999).
 18 November – Jim Cruickshank, 69, Queen's Park, Hearts, Dumbarton and Scotland goalkeeper.
 28 December – Avi Cohen, 54, Rangers defender.
 24 January – Alec Boden, 85, Celtic and Ayr United defender.
 27 January – Svein Mathisen, 58, Norwegian player who made three appearances for Hibernian in 1978.
 10 March – Danny Paton, 75, Hearts forward.
 4 April – John Niven, 89, East Fife and Kilmarnock goalkeeper.
 6 April – Jim Blair, 64, St Mirren and Hibs forward.
 11 April – Jimmy Briggs, 74, Dundee United defender.
 12 April – Ronnie Coyle, 46, Raith Rovers, Celtic, Ayr United, Clyde, East Fife and Queen's Park defender.
 20 April – Allan Brown, 84, East Fife and Scotland forward.
 28 April – Willie O'Neill, 70, Celtic defender.
 30 April – Eddie Turnbull, 88, Hibernian and Scotland player; manager of Queen's Park, Aberdeen and Hibernian.
 5 May – Dougie McCracken, 46, Ayr United, Dumbarton and East Fife player.
 5 May – Tommy Wright, 83, Partick Thistle, East Fife and Scotland winger.
 14 May – Ernie Walker, 83, Secretary of the Scottish Football Association from 1977 to 1990.
 30 May – Eddie Morrison, 63, Kilmarnock and Morton forward; Kilmarnock manager.

Notes and references

 
Seasons in Scottish football